Pedro Fré CSsR (August 30, 1924 – April 3, 2014) was a Catholic bishop.

Ordained to the priesthood in 1950, Fré was named bishop of the Diocese of Corumbá, Brazil, in 1985. In 1989, he was appointed Bishop of the Diocese of Barretos and retired in 2000.

Notes

1924 births
2014 deaths
20th-century Roman Catholic bishops in Brazil
Roman Catholic bishops of Barretos
Roman Catholic bishops of Corumbá